Kami no Shizuku may refer to:

Kami no Shizuku, Japanese manga series, in French titled Les Gouttes de Dieu
Kami no Shizuku (TV series), Japanese 2009 TV series based on the manga